Youngpur Urdu: ینگ پور is large village 15 km away from Okara city on Faisalabad road. It has a total population of over 20000. 6500 vote registered in village.It is a part of Okara District, Pakistan.

History
As per legend Young pur was named after an English army remount officer Mr Young prior to the partition of India. It was basically a residential area for remount officers and their labor. It was populated mainly by the migrants of India. Jatt mainly from FEROZPUR 
and Jalandher are the major political Tribe. Rajput Bhatti [In some parts of modern Pakistan, especially in the Northern and Central Punjab, a fact deeply resented by the authentic Bhatti Rajputs of Pakistan]are from Ferozpur. Bhatties are economically strong. Young pur's cricket team and hockey team young eleven young pur registered whose president syed zahid Iqbal and captain شفیق الرحمان has won many major events in and hockey coach malik kashif hafeez in under supervision of Ateeq, FIJA jutt, rehan ijaz adil altaf arshad and faheem karnail, 6th september youm e difa e pakistan sports maila was also celebrated on account of shuhda e pakistan 1965 war every year under supervision of young our task force YPTFOkara District.

Geographical position

Youngpur is located 160 km away from Lahore and 87 km away from Faisalabad and comes in Punjab. Faisalabad Road lining Okara to Faisalabad pass through the village which contributed to the prosperity of the village, and leading to quick communication with the city. Bahadarnagar Farm is the neighbouring Government research farm which is only 4 km away from the village.

Structure

The Village is a square if viewed from above. That is because of the planned structure by the British. All the roads in the village are straight and wide even the City Okara cannot  compete with it. Though there has always been drainage problem. The village grew from only some streets but now cover all of the space available for the houses including Shamlat, though uneven division of plots has led to houses of only some meter square leading to high population density in the area. Youngpur has 2 schools one for boys, and other is for girls.

Leadership

Tariq jutt ghoripal ,Maqbool bhatti and Shaheryar Javed Bhatti is the incumbent ceremonial head of Youngpur and also, the most prominent landlord.

Details
Youngpur has 90 murabas of cultivated land that is equal to 2250 acre. Though the locals have brought a lot of lands in the neighbouring villages.  Even though the main source of income is agriculture either directly or indirectly. A large amount of work force is utilized by the Workshops and different kind of the shops, it is one of the only self-sufficient villages in the area. There are also a large amount of shops on the Faisalabad Road whose number only the cities or major towns can match. 

Villages in Okara District